Vice-Admiral Lynn Gordon Mason CMM, CD (born 1942) is a retired officer of the Canadian Forces. He was Commander Maritime Command from 27 June 1995 to 9 January 1997.

Career 
Mason joined the Royal Canadian Navy in 1960. He became Commanding Officer of the destroyer  in 1981, Commander of the Fifth Canadian Destroyer Squadron in 1985 and Commander of NATO's Standing Naval Force Atlantic in 1987. He went on to be Commandant of the Canadian Forces College in 1988, Deputy Chief of Staff for Operations at Headquarters of the Supreme Allied Commander Atlantic in 1989 and Chief of Maritime Doctrine and Operations at National Defence Headquarters in 1991. He then became Chief of Staff to the Maritime Commander in 1992, Commander Maritime Forces Atlantic in 1992 and Deputy Chief of Defence Staff in 1994. His last appointment was as Commander Maritime Command in 1995 before retiring in 1997.

In retirement he became Chief Executive of CarteNav Solutions.

Awards and decorations 
Mason's personal awards and decorations include the following:

References 

Canadian admirals
Living people
Royal Canadian Navy officers
Commanders of the Order of Military Merit (Canada)
1942 births
Commanders of the Royal Canadian Navy